The 2021–22 FC Zbrojovka Brno season is the club's 4th season in the Fortuna národní liga. The team is competing in Fortuna národní liga and the Czech Cup.

First team squad
.

Out on loan
.

Transfers

In

Out

Overall transfer activity

Expenditure
Summer:  €0

Total:  €0

Income
Summer:  €1,150,000

Total:  €1,150,000

Net totals
Summer:  €1,150,000

Total:  €1,150,000

Friendly matches

Pre-season

Mid-season

Competitions

Overview

Fortuna národní liga

Results summary

Results by round

League table

Results

Czech Cup

Results

Squad statistics

Appearances and goals

|-
! colspan=16 style=background:#dcdcdc; text-align:center| Goalkeepers

|-
! colspan=16 style=background:#dcdcdc; text-align:center| Defenders

|-
! colspan=16 style=background:#dcdcdc; text-align:center| Midfielders

|-
! colspan=16 style=background:#dcdcdc; text-align:center| Forwards

|-
! colspan=16 style=background:#dcdcdc; text-align:center| Players transferred/loaned out during the season

Notes

Goal Scorers
{| class="wikitable" style="text-align:center"
|-
!width=15|
!width=15|
!width=15|
!width=15|
!width=145|Name
!width=130|Fortuna národní liga
!width=130|MOL Cup
!width=130|Total
|-
|rowspan=1|1
|37
|FW
|
|Jakub Řezníček
|10
|1
|11
|-
|rowspan=1|2
|14
|FW
|
|Jakub Přichystal
|6
|0
|6
|-
|rowspan=1|3
|22
|FW
|
|Jan Hladík
|3
|2
|5
|-
|rowspan=2|4
|11
|MF
|
|Adam Fousek
|4
|0
|4
|-
|19
|MF
|
|Michal Ševčík
|2
|2
|4
|-
|rowspan=1|6
|19
|FW
|
|Martin Zikl
|0
|2
|2
|-
|rowspan=8|7
|6
|DF
|
|Lukáš Endl
|1
|0
|1
|-
|7
|MF
|
|Pavel Zavadil
|1
|0
|1
|-
|8
|FW
|
|Lukáš Rogožan
|1
|0
|1
|-
|15
|DF
|
|Jan Štěrba
|1
|0
|1
|-
|17
|DF
|
|Jan Moravec
|1
|0
|1
|-
|30
|MF
|
|Martin Sedlák
|1
|0
|1
|-
|34
|MF
|
|Ota Kohoutek
|1
|0
|1
|-
|
|MF
|
|Fabián Matula
|0
|1
|1
|-
|colspan=5|Own goals
|0
|0
|0
|-
|colspan=5|Totals
|32
|8
|40

Notes

Assists
{| class="wikitable" style="text-align:center"
|-
!width=15|
!width=15|
!width=15|
!width=15|
!width=145|Name
!width=130|Fortuna národní liga
!width=130|MOL Cup
!width=130|Total
|-
|rowspan=2|1
|11
|FW
|
|Adam Fousek
|5
|
|5
|-
|19
|FW
|
|Michal Ševčík
|5
|0
|5
|-
|rowspan=1|3
|22
|FW
|
|Jan Hladík
|3
|2
|5
|-
|rowspan=1|4
|19
|MF
|
|Michal Ševčík
|2
|2
|4
|-
|rowspan=1|5
|11
|MF
|
|Adam Fousek
|3
|0
|3
|-
|rowspan=1|6
|19
|FW
|
|Martin Zikl
|0
|2
|2
|-
|rowspan=5|7
|17
|DF
|
|Jan Moravec
|1
|0
|1
|-
|30
|FW
|
|Martin Sedlák
|1
|0
|1
|-
|8
|FW
|
|Lukáš Rogožan
|1
|0
|1
|-
|7
|MF
|
|Pavel Zavadil
|1
|0
|1
|-
|
|MF
|
|Fabián Matula
|0
|1
|1
|-
|colspan=5|Totals
|27
|8
|35

Notes

Clean sheets
{| class="wikitable" style="text-align:center"
|-
!width=15|
!width=15|
!width=15|
!width=15|
!width=145|Name
!width=130|Fortuna národní liga
!width=130|MOL Cup
!width=130|Total
|-
|rowspan=1|1
|53
|GK
|
|Martin Berkovec
|9
|0
|9
|-
|rowspan=1|2
|59
|GK
|
|Jiří Floder
|1
|1
|2
|-
|colspan=5|Totals
|10
|1
|11

Notes

Disciplinary record
{| class="wikitable" style="font-size: 100%; text-align: center;"
|-
|rowspan="2" width="10%" align="center"|Number
|rowspan="2" width="10%" align="center"|Nation
|rowspan="2" width="10%" align="center"|Position
|rowspan="2" width="20%" align="center"|Name
|colspan="2" align="center"|Fortuna národní liga
|colspan="2" align="center"|Czech Cup
|colspan="2" align="center"|Total
|-
!width=60 style="background: #FFEE99"|
!width=60 style="background: #FF8888"|
!width=60 style="background: #FFEE99"|
!width=60 style="background: #FF8888"|
!width=60 style="background: #FFEE99"|
!width=60 style="background: #FF8888"|
|-
|colspan="14"|Players away on loan:
|-
|colspan="14"|Players who left Zbrojovka during the season:
|-
|colspan="3"|
|TOTALS
| 
| 
| 
| 
| 
| 
|-

Notes

References

External links
Official website

FC Zbrojovka Brno seasons
Zbrojovka Brno